Srđan Ivanović (born 2 May 1989) is a Serbian football midfielder who plays for Železnik in Serbian League Belgrade.

References

External links
 

1989 births
Living people
Footballers from Belgrade
Association football midfielders
Serbian footballers
FK Bežanija players
FK Mladi Radnik players
FK Sinđelić Niš players
FK Železnik players
FK Jagodina players
Serbian SuperLiga players